The pigmy leaf-toed gecko (Hemidactylus pumilio) is a species of gecko. It is endemic to Socotra.

References

Hemidactylus
Reptiles described in 1899
Reptiles of the Middle East
Endemic fauna of Socotra
Taxa named by George Albert Boulenger